Shay Astar (born September 29, 1981) is an American actress, singer, and songwriter best known for portraying the teenage feminist August Leffler, a semi-regular character on the sitcom 3rd Rock from the Sun.

Career 
Astar played Elizabeth in the Halloween comedy film Ernest Scared Stupid (1991), Paula Kelly in the Boy Meets World episode "I Am Not a Crook", and Isabella, the imaginary friend of a young girl aboard the Enterprise in the Star Trek: The Next Generation episode "Imaginary Friend" in 1992. In 1996, she voiced Andrea on the cartoon series The Oz Kids.

Astar released her first EP, Blue Music EP, on May 24, 2010. This was followed by her full-length debut, Blue Music on September 28, 2010.

Filmography

Film

Television

References

External links

1981 births
Living people
American child actresses
American film actresses
American television actresses
Actresses from California
Musicians from California
20th-century American actresses
21st-century American actresses